Radiradirah was a New Zealand comedy sketch show that originally aired from 21 May to 9 July 2010, with a total of 8 episodes.

It featured several well known New Zealand comedians such as Taika Waititi, Rhys Darby, David Fane, Oscar Kightley and Madeleine Sami, as well as the voicing talents of internationally recognised comedian and music artist Jemaine Clement.

Episodes

External links

2010 New Zealand television series debuts
2010 New Zealand television series endings
English-language television shows
New Zealand comedy television series
Television shows funded by NZ on Air
Three (TV channel) original programming